Alapan Bandyopadhyay (born 17 May 1961) is an ex-Indian Administrative Service (IAS) officer and former Chief Secretary of State for the Government of West Bengal.  He is Chief Advisor for Chief Minister Mamata Banerjee since 1 June 2021. He took over from IAS officer Rajiva Sinha, in the year 2020, starting his tenure as Chief Secretary of West Bengal.

Career
Alapan was an officer of IAS batch-1987 from West Bengal. He was earlier a district magistrate of Howrah, North and South 24 Parganas districts. He had also served as Chief Executive Officer, Kolkata Metropolitan Development Authority and Kolkata Municipal Commissioner. He has also headed several departments — transport, Micro, Small and Medium Enterprises (MSME), commerce and industry, information and culture, and home — as principal secretary. The IAS officer also served as interim state election commissioner in 2015. He has penned several books including Amlar Mon in 2016 and edited several other books from Prosongo Gorkhaland (1987) to Philosopher's Stone: Speeches and Writings of Sir Daniel Hamilton (2000). He retired from IAS on 31 May 2021 and was appointed as Chief Advisor of Chief Minister of West Bengal from 1 June 2021 for 3 years.
A student of Ramakrishna Mission Narendrapur (3rd rank holder in Secondary Examination, 1976, and a National Talent Search Scholar, 1978) and a student of Presidency College and Calcutta University (gold medalist in M.A. Political Science in 1983) he was a journalist with Anandabazar Patrika (ABP Group) before joining the IAS.

Personal life 
Bandyopadhyay was born in 1961 in Asansol, West Bengal. He is married to the current Vice Chancellor of the University of Calcutta and academician Sonali Chakravarti Banerjee. His son Milinda Banerjee is lecturer of Modern History in University of St. Andrews, Scotland.

References 

1967 births
Living people
Indian civil servants